The 2023 FIA Formula 3 Championship is a motor racing championship for Formula 3 cars that is sanctioned by the Fédération Internationale de l'Automobile (FIA). The championship is the fourteenth season of Formula 3 racing and the fifth season run under the FIA Formula 3 Championship moniker. It is an open-wheel racing category that serves as the third tier of formula racing in the FIA Global Pathway. The category is run in support of selected rounds of the 2023 FIA Formula One World Championship. As the championship is a spec series, all teams and drivers that compete in the championship run the same car, the Dallara F3 2019.

Prema Racing entered the championship as the defending teams' champion, having secured their title at the last race of the 2022 season.

Entries 
The following teams and drivers are under contract to compete in the 2023 championship. As the championship is a spec series, all teams compete with an identical Dallara F3 2019 chassis and tyre compounds developed by Pirelli. Each car is powered by a  naturally-aspirated V6 engine developed by Mecachrome.

Team changes 
German Formula 4 team PHM Racing took over the entry and assets of Charouz Racing System at the end of the 2022 season, and runs in cooperation with the Czech squad under the PHM Racing by Charouz moniker.

Carlin compete under new ownership in 2023. The New Zealand-based car manufacturer Rodin Cars became majority shareholder of the team. With that, the team is now called Rodin Carlin.

Hitech partnered with hardware company Pulse-Eight during the off-season, changing the official name of the team to Hitech Pulse-Eight.

Driver changes 
Reigning teams' champion Prema Racing renewed their lineup completely, as Oliver Bearman, Arthur Leclerc and Jak Crawford all made the step up to the FIA Formula 2 Championship. The team promoted two of their Formula Regional European Championship drivers to replace them: Ferrari protégé Dino Beganovic, who won the title, and Mercedes junior Paul Aron, who came third. Partnering Beganovic and Aron is Williams Academy driver Zak O'Sullivan, moving from Carlin, with whom he came eleventh in 2022.

Trident also changed their full lineup, as Roman Staněk and Zane Maloney moved up to Formula 2 and Jonny Edgar switched to MP Motorsport. Gabriel Bortoleto makes the step up from the Formula Regional European Championship, where he came sixth in 2022. Joining him is 2022 Euroformula Open champion Oliver Goethe, who deputised for Hunter Yeany at Campos Racing at two events in 2022, and Formula Regional European rookie champion Leonardo Fornaroli.

ART Grand Prix replaced Victor Martins, who won the drivers' title with the team in 2022, with the reigning F4 Spanish champion and Alpine affiliate Nikola Tsolov. Juan Manuel Correa also left the team to return to the Formula 2 championship. His seat was filled by Kaylen Frederick, 2020 British F3 champion, who came 17th with Hitech Grand Prix in his second season in FIA F3 in 2022.

MP Motorsport's three drivers were all replaced. Kush Maini joined Campos Racing in Formula 2, with Mari Boya promoted from MP's Formula Regional European Championship team to replace him, after the Spaniard came tenth in 2022. Jonny Edgar took over Alexander Smolyar's seat, moving over from Trident, with whom he came 12th in his second F3 season in 2022. The lineup was completed by Williams Academy driver Franco Colapinto, who came ninth in 2022 with Van Amersfoort Racing and swapped teams with Caio Collet.

Hitech Pulse-Eight recruited 2022 Formula Regional European runner-up Gabriele Minì, who replaced Red Bull junior Isack Hadjar, who left the series to join Formula 2. Kaylen Frederick also left the team and joined ART Grand Prix. His seat was filled by Sebastián Montoya, who made his championship debut in 2022 when he replaced the injured Yeany at Campos in Zandvoort. The teams' lineup was completed by 2022 GB3 champion Luke Browning.

Van Amersfoort Racing signed Caio Collet, 8th in 2022 with MP Motorsport, to replace Franco Colapinto. Reece Ushijima was superseded by Tommy Smith, who had been driving in regional F3-level series since 2019, most recently GB3 in 2022, where he took one win on the way to 19th with Douglas Motorsport.

Carlin fielded an all-new driver lineup, with Zak O'Sullivan switching to Prema, Brad Benavides graduating to Formula 2, and Enzo Trulli switching to Japanese Super Formula Lights. The latter two were replaced by 2020 F4 US champion Hunter Yeany, moving over from Campos after an injury-curtailed season, and Ido Cohen, who drove for Jenzer in 2022 and returned to Carlin, with whom he competed in 2021 and in the 2020 Euroformula Open Championship. The team also signed one Williams Academy driver to replace another, with O'Sullivan's seat being taken over by 2022 British F4 vice-champion Oliver Gray.

Campos Racing signed Christian Mansell, who had already contested two Formula 3 rounds at Charouz Racing System in 2022, to replace David Vidales, who also moved to Super Formula Lights. Hunter Yeany also left the team to join Carlin and was replaced by 2022 Spanish F4 and French F4 vice-champion Hugh Barter.

Jenzer Motorsport has an all-rookie lineup in 2023, replacing Carlin-bound Ido Cohen, Federico Malvestiti and William Alatalo. Alex García made his Formula 3 debut after a seventh place in the 2022 Euroformula Open Championship with Motopark. Alongside him will be PHM-backed Nikita Bedrin, who steps up to the category after two years in Formula 4, with a high point of fourth place in the 2022 ADAC and UAE F4 championships. The last seat was filled by another PHM-supported F4 graduate in Taylor Barnard, last years' ADAC F4 vice-champion.

New entrant PHM Racing by Charouz hired Sophia Flörsch for their first season in the championship, a move partially funded by FIA Formula 3 promoter Formula Motorsport. Flörsch previously drove for Campos Racing in 2020 and had competed in endurance and sportscar racing since then. She replaced Francesco Pizzi, who left FIA F3 to join TJ Speed in USF Pro 2000. Their second seat, which was shared by a handful of drivers in 2022, was filled by Roberto Faria, who competed in GB3 for the last three years, coming fifth in the latter two. The final seat was taken by Piotr Wiśnicki, who graduated to FIA F3 after a season in the Formula Regional European Championship to replace László Tóth.

Race calendar 
The calendar for the 2023 season was announced in November 2022:

Calendar changes 

 The championship will expand to ten rounds, featuring a total of twenty races.
 The championship is scheduled to make its debut in Australia, supporting the Australian Grand Prix at the Albert Park Circuit.
 Formula 3 will return to the Circuit de Monaco for the first time since 2005. The championship also raced at the venue in 2012 as the GP3 Series.
 The round at Circuit Zandvoort, in support of the Dutch Grand Prix, was removed from the calendar.

Regulation changes

Technical regulations 
Formula 2 and Formula 3 run with 55% sustainable fuel in 2023, supplied by Aramco, who replaced Elf Aquitaine as an official fuel partner and supplier. In a bid to decrease the championships' carbon footprint, an incremental gain in usage is planned until the 2027 season, where usage of 100% sustainable fuel is planned.

Season report

Round 1: Bahrain
Hitech Pulse-Eight driver Gabriele Minì claimed feature race pole position with the fastest qualifying time at the Bahrain International Circuit. Franco Colapinto qualified twelfth to start the reverse-grid sprint race from first place.

Results and standings

Season summary

Scoring system 
Points are awarded to the top ten classified finishers in both races. The feature race pole-sitter also receives two points, and one point is given to the driver who sets the fastest lap inside the top ten in both races. No extra points are awarded to the sprint race pole-sitter, as the grid for that is set by reversing the top twelve qualifiers.

 Sprint race points

Points are awarded to the top 10 classified finishers. One point is awarded to the driver who sets the fastest lap if he finished in the top 10. No fastest lap point is awarded if it is set by a driver outside the top 10.

 Feature race points

Points are awarded to the top ten classified finishers. Bonus points are awarded to the pole-sitter and to the driver who sets the fastest lap and finishes in the top ten.

Drivers' championship

Teams' championship 

Notes: 
 Rows are not related to the drivers: within each team, individual race standings are sorted purely based on the final classification in the race (not by total points scored in the event, which includes points awarded for fastest lap and pole position).<noinclude>

Notes

References

External links 

 

 
FIA Formula 3 Championship seasons
Formula 3
FIA Formula 3
FIA Formula 3